Sal Santoro (born July 14, 1951) is an American politician and a Republican member of the Kentucky House of Representatives representing District 60 since January 2007. Santoro was a Kentucky State Policeman.

Education
Santoro earned his BA from the University of Cincinnati and his MA from Xavier University.

Elections
2012 Santoro was unopposed for both the May 22, 2012 Republican Primary, and the November 6, 2012 General election, winning with 21,798 votes.
2006 When District 60 Representative Paul Marcotte left the Legislature and left the seat open, Santoro won the 2006 Republican Primary with 1,487 votes (55.2%) and won the November 7, 2006 General election with 9,783 votes (68.4%) against Democratic nominee David Ryan.
2008 Santoro was unopposed for both the 2008 Republican Primary and the November 4, 2008 General election, winning with 20,471 votes.
2010 Santoro was unopposed for the May 18, 2010 Republican Primary and won the November 2, 2010 General election with 12,595 votes (80.4%) against Independent candidate Sean McPhillips.

References

External links
Official page at the Kentucky General Assembly

Sal Santoro at Ballotpedia
Sal Santoro at OpenSecrets

Place of birth missing (living people)
1951 births
Living people
American state police officers
Republican Party members of the Kentucky House of Representatives
People from Florence, Kentucky
University of Cincinnati alumni
Xavier University alumni
21st-century American politicians